Tomolips is a genus of true weevils in the beetle family Curculionidae. There are at least four described species in Tomolips.

Species
These four species belong to the genus Tomolips:
 Tomolips asperatus Wollaston & T.V., 1873
 Tomolips bicalcaratus Wollaston & T.V., 1873
 Tomolips pinicola Voss, 1953
 Tomolips quercicola (Boheman, 1845) (black wood weevil)

References

Further reading

 
 
 

Cossoninae
Articles created by Qbugbot